Osman Rastoder (1882 – 26 January 1946) was a commander of the Muslim militia in upper Bihor during the Second World War. He was a collaborator with the Italians during their World War II occupation of Bihor.

Rastoder belonged to the supporters of the annexation of Sandžak by the Greater Albania.

Early life 
Rastoder was born in a wealthy family and could afford to be educated first in madrassas in Novi Pazar and Đakovica, and later in Istanbul.They were part of the Kuči tribe and moved to Turkey in 1915 and remained there while Osman returned to Balkans in 1919, to Novi Pazar where he married himself second time. He had seven children in two marriages. In 1926 he returned to Petnjica with both of his wives where he was appointed as mullah in villages Petnjica and Savin Bor. Since 1929 he was appointed as imam in local mosque. Besides his native Albanian and Serbian language Rastoder spoke Turkish and Arabic.

World War II
In June 1941 Rastoder was appointed as commander of local Muslim detachment which evolved in September 1941 in a detachment of Sandžak Muslim militia responsible for the territory of upper Bihor.

At the beginning of 1941 the relations between towns Petnjica and Police worsened due to the killing of Rastoder's son, in Berane.

During the Uprising in Montenegro a detachment of the militia from Bihor commanded by Rastoder attacked insurgents toward Berane. His forces burned Orthodox Christians in villages Goražde, Zagrađe, Tmušiće and Lješnica. In autumn 1941, Rastoder was appointed to command the militia detachment in upper Bihor with its seat in Petnjica. In February of 1942, Rastoder led an attack against Serb villages on right side of river Lim in srez of Bijelo Polje. In this attack villages Ivanje, Raduliće, Potoci, Crnča and Dubovo were burnt. 

Together with militia commanders (including Sulejman Pačariz and Husein Rovčanin) he participated in a conference in village of Godijeva, and agreed to attack Serb villages near Sjenica and other parts of Sandžak. On 31 March 1942, Chetnik leader Pavle Đurišić met with Rastoder and offered him a peace agreement, which Rastoder refused. Rastoder favorized armed conflicts with Orthodox population of the region, above all with those from Bijelo Polje and Berane.

The detachment of militia commanded by Rastoder, supported by Albanian irregulars and German forces, attacked and killed 35 Partisans and 19 Italian irregulars of the Garibaldi Battalion on 22 January 1944 near the village of Vrbica (Berane). Rastoder was killed by police on 26 January 1946 on Ladevac mountain.

Legacy
In February 2013, members of the Bosniak community in Luxembourg established the Mulla Hrastoder, an award named for Rastoder in his honor. Streets in Sarajevo, Bosnia and Herzegovina and in Petnjica, Montenegro were named after him.

See also
 Rastoder

References

1882 births
1946 deaths
Albanian collaborators with Fascist Italy
Albanian collaborators with Nazi Germany
Albanian nationalists
Albanian Muslims
Montenegrin collaborators with Fascist Italy
Montenegrin collaborators with Nazi Germany
Montenegrin Muslims
Sandžak Muslim militia
Place of death missing
Date of birth missing